The Gaeltacht Corca Dhuibhne is located on the western end of the Dingle peninsula in County Kerry, Ireland. It's a predominantly Irish-speaking area. It stretches from Abhainn an Scáil to Dún Chaoin and An Clochán to An Daingean. The villages in the area are Abhainn an Scáil, Lios Póil, Daingean Uí Chúis, Ceann Trá, Dún Chaoin, Baile an Fheirtéaraigh, Baile na nGall and An Clochán. There are between 6,000-7,000 people living in the region and over 3,000 are Irish speaking.

The national radio station RTÉ Raidió na Gaeltachta has a regional studio in Baile na nGall.

The following is a list of population statistics for the following Electoral Divisions in the area:

 Cill Chuain (438) (79%)
 Cill Maoilcheadair (536) (77%)
 Dun Urlann (407) (77%)
 Marthain (238) (67%)
 Dun Chaoin (207) (63%)
 Ceann Tra (448) (55%)
 An Mhin Aird (373) (43%)
 Na Gleannta (1,419) (41%)
 Cinn Aird (357) (39%)
 Ce Bhreanainn (127) (36%)
 An Clochan (258) (32%)
 Daingean Uí Chúis (1,593) (24%)
 An Baile Dubh (131) (32%)

Gaeltacht Uíbh Ráthaigh

This smaller Gaeltacht area in terms of population with only 500 Irish native speakers is located on the Iveragh peninsula south of Dingle.

List of EDs:
 Cathair Donall (97) (10%)
 Doire Fhionain (151) (13%)
 Trian Iarthach (126) (15%)
 An tImleach (319) (14%)
 An Baile Breac (64) (18%)
 Maistir Gaoithe (83) (20%)
 Doire Ianna (206) (21%)
 Ceannuigh (143) (26%)
 Loch Luioch (16) (25%)
 Baile an Sceilg (346) (30%)
 Toghroinn Fhionain (134) (31%)
 Na Beathacha (15) (46%)

See also
County Galway
Galway City Gaeltacht
Gaeltacht Cois Fharraige
Conamara Theas
Aran Islands
Joyce Country
County Donegal
Gaoith Dhobhair
Na Rosa
Cloch Cheann Fhaola
Gaeltacht an Láir
County Mayo
Gaeltacht Iorrais agus Acaill

External links
Gaeltacht Corca Dhuibhne definition
Gaeltacht Irish language use survey 2007

Geography of County Kerry